In South Africa the Department of Public Enterprises is the shareholder representative of the South African Government with oversight responsibility for state-owned enterprises in key sectors. Some companies are not directly controlled by the Department of Public Enterprises, but by various other departments. Further, not all state owned entities are registered as companies.

State-owned enterprises play a significant role in the South African economy. In key sectors such as electricity, transport (air, rail, freight, and pipelines), and telecommunications, SOEs play a lead role, often defined by law, although limited competition is allowed in some sectors (i.e., telecommunications and air). The government's interest in these sectors often competes with and discourages foreign investment.

The Department of Public Enterprises minister has publicly stated that South Africa's SOEs should advance economic transformation, industrialization and import substitution. DPE has oversight responsibility in full or in part for six of the approximately 700 SOEs that exist at the national, provincial, and local levels: Alexkor (diamonds), Denel (military equipment), Eskom (electricity generation), Transnet (railway transport and pipelines)  South African Express, South African Forestry Company (SAFCOL) (forestry), South African Broadcasting Corporation. These seven SOEs employ approximately 105,000 people. The states share of the investment was 21% while private enterprise contributed 63% (government spending made up the remainder of 16%). The IMF estimates that the debt of the SOEs would add 13.5% to the overall national debt.

History
Many state-owned firms were established during the apartheid era to counter the impact of international sanctions against the country. The ANC government initially sold stakes in the companies, and lowered import tariffs. Those measures were reversed following opposition from COSATU and the South African Communist Party. By 2007, an alliance of unions and leftist factions within the ANC had unseated President Thabo Mbeki, replacing him with Jacob Zuma. The new ANC policy aimed at expanding the role of SOEs in the economy, following the example of China.

Although in 2015 and 2016, senior government leaders discussed allowing private-sector investment into some of the more than 700 state-owned enterprises and recently released a report of a presidential review commission on SOE, which called for nationalization of SOEs, no concrete action has been taken on the topic yet.

Financial troubles and corruption 
By the end of the Zuma administration in 2018 corruption within South African state owned enterprises by individuals connected to government such as the controversial Gupta family had led to many enterprises facing deep financial difficulty.  Deepening financial issues, mismanagement, maladministration and government bailouts of enterprises such as the South African Broadcasting Corporation, South African Airways, Eskom, Denel, PRASA, and Transnet caused increased public controversy.  By the end of 2015–16 combined government guarantees on debts owed by state owned enterprises had reached R467 billion (equivalent to US$33.1 billion) and were expected to reach R500 billion by 2020 representing 10 percent of South Africa's GDP.  The situation at Eskom was regarded as so serious as to lead the South African business newspaper Business Day to speculate that it could cause a national banking crisis. In 2021 the South African Treasury reported that South African Airways had accumulated a total loss between 2008 and 2020 of R32 billion (US$ 2.1 billion) and received a total of R60 billion (US$ 4 billion) in government guarantees.

Table list
The Public Finance Management Act distinguishes between three types of public entities. Schedule 1 entities compromise Constitutional Institutions including the Independent Electoral Commission and Public Protector among others. Schedule 2 entities are listed as Major Public Entities and have greater autonomy than Schedule 3 entities. Schedule 2 entities are listed below. Schedule 3 entities are subdivided into:

 National Public Entities - which generally function as specialised agencies or not-for-profit organisations such as the Companies and Intellectual Property Commission, the Human Sciences Research Council and the Road Accident Fund;
 National Government Business Enterprises - which function as profit-seeking businesses including the Council for Scientific and Industrial Research, Passenger Rail Agency of South Africa and Rand Water;
 Provincial Public Entities - which have a provincial focus and function as provincial agencies such as the Gautrain Management Agency and various provincial gambling and liquor boards;
 Provincial Government Business Enterprises - which are profit-seeking businesses controlled by provincial government and includes the Richards Bay Industrial Development Zone and the East London Industrial Development Zone.

Full list 
There are currently 108 State Owned Enterprises in South Africa

Accounting Standards Board
Agricultural Research Council (ARC)
Air Traffic and Navigation Services Company
Airports Company South Africa (ACSA)
Alexkor Limited
Armaments Corporation of South Africa (ARMSCOR)
Blind SA
Brand South Africa
Breede-Gouritz CMA
Broadband Infraco
Broadcasting Complaints Commission of South Africa (BCCSA)
Cape Town International Airport
Central Energy Fund (CEF)
Commission for Conciliation, Mediation and Arbitration
Commission for Employment Equity
Companies and Intellectual Property Commission (CIPC)
Compensation Fund
Competition Commission (The)
Competition Tribunal
Council for Geoscience
Council for Medical Schemes
Council on Higher Education
Denel (Pty) Ltd
Development Bank of Southern Africa (DBSA)
Eskom
Estate Agency Affairs Board (The)
Export Credit Insurance Corporation of South Africa (Ltd.)
Film and Publication Board (FPB)
Financial Sector Conduct Authority (FSCA)
Free State Development Corporation 
Freedom Park
Government Employees Medical Scheme (GEMS)
Government Employees Pension Fund (GEPF)
Health and Welfare Sector Education and Training Authority (HWSETA)
Health Professions Council of South Africa (HPCSA)
Housing Development Agency (HDA)
Human Sciences Research Council (HSRC)
Independent Development Trust
Industrial Development Corporation [Ltd] (IDC)
Ingonyama Trust Board
Institute of People Management (IPM)
Ithala Development Finance Corporation (Ltd)
Khula Enterprise Finance (Ltd)
King Shaka International Airport
Land Bank and Agriculture Bank of South Africa [ Land Bank ]
Legal Aid South Africa
Limpopo Economic Development Enterprise
Media Development and Diversity Agency (MDDA)
Mhlathuze Water
Mining Qualification Authority
Mintek (Council for Mineral Technology)
National Advisory Council on Innovation (NACI)
National Agricultural Marketing Council
National Archives of South Africa (NASA)
National Arts Council of South Africa (NACSA)
National Consumer Commission (The) (NCC)
National Credit Regulator (NCR)
National Development Agency (NDA)
National Economic Development and Labour Council (NEDLAC)
National Electronic Media of South Africa (NEMISA)
National Empowerment Fund
National Energy Regulator (NERSA)
National Film and Video Foundation
National Gambling Board of South Africa
National Home Builders Registration Council (NHBRC)
National House of Traditional Leaders 
National Housing Finance Corporation (NHFC)
National Lotteries Commission
National Nuclear Regulator (NNR)
National Peace Accord Trust (NPAT)
National Ports Authority (NPA)
National Student Financial Aid Scheme (NSFAS)
National Youth Development Agency (NYDA)
Nelson Mandela Museum
North West Development Corporation
OR Tambo International Airport
Passenger Rail Agency of South African (PRASA)
Pebble Bed Modular Reactor (Pty) Limited (PBMR)
Perishable Products Export Control Board
PetroSA (Pty) Ltd
Private Security Industry Regulatory Authority (PSIRA)
Public Investment Corporation (PIC)
Rand Water
Refugee Appeal Board
Road Accident Fund (RAF)
Road Traffic Infringement Agency (RTIA)
Road Traffic Management Corporation (RTMC)
Robben Island Museum
Safety and Security, Sector Education & Training Authority (SASSETA)
Small Enterprise Development Agency (SEDA)
Small Enterprise Finance Agency (SEFA)
South African Agency For Science and Technology Advancement (SAASTA)
South African Airways (SAA)
South African Broadcasting Corporation (SABC)
South African Bureau of Standards (SABS)
South African Civil Aviation Authority
South African Council for Educators (SACE)
South African Council for Social Service Professions (SACSSP)
South African Diamond and Precious Metals Regulator
South African Express
South African Forestry Company (Ltd) (SAFCOL)
South African Heritage Resources Agency
South African Institute for Drug-Free Sport
South African Library for the Blind
South African Local Government Association (SALGA) 
South African National Accreditation System
South African National Council for the Blind
South African National Parks (SANParks)
South African National Road Agency
South African Nuclear Energy Corporation SOC Ltd (NECSA)
South African Post Office (SAPO)
South African Qualifications Authority (SAQA)
South African Reserve Bank (SARB)
South African Social Security Agency (SASSA)
South African Special Risk Insurance Association (SASRIA)
South African State Theatre - Pretoria
South African Tourism
South African Veterinary Council
South African Weather Service (SAWS)
Special Investigating Unit (SIU)
State Information Technology Agency (SITA)
Tax Ombud: South Africa
Technology Innovation Agency
Telkom SA (Ltd)
Transnet (Ltd) 
Universal Service Agency and Access of South Africa
Water Research Commission (WRC)

See also
 Minister of Public Enterprises
 Department of Public Enterprises
 List of companies of South Africa

References

External links 

 Index of all South African state owned enterprises

 
South Africa